Power is an American crime drama television series created and produced by Courtney A. Kemp in collaboration with Curtis "50 Cent" Jackson. It aired on the Starz network from June 7, 2014, to February 9, 2020.

Upon release, Power gained positive reviews and it is one of Starz's most highly rated shows and one of cable's most watched shows. Prior to the premiere of the fifth season, Starz renewed the show for a sixth and final season, which premiered on August 25, 2019.

Overview
Power tells the story of James St. Patrick (Omari Hardwick), an intelligent, smooth, yet, ruthless drug dealer who goes by the alias of "Ghost." He wishes to leave the criminal world to pursue legitimate business interests as a nightclub owner. St. Patrick aims to balance those two lives, while also avoiding police capture, trying to navigate his crumbling marriage and manage shifting economic alliances.

The show also features James' family, which consists of his wife Tasha (Naturi Naughton), twins Tariq (Michael Rainey Jr.) and Raina(Donshea Hopkins) and baby Yasmine. Power also follows James' criminal partner and best friend Tommy Egan (Joseph Sikora), love interest and criminal prosecutor Angela Valdes (Lela Loren), friend-turned-rival Kanan Stark (50 Cent), protege and rival Andre Coleman (Rotimi Akinosho), and Angela's colleague, Cooper Saxe (Shane Johnson). Defense attorney Joe Proctor (Jerry Ferrara), district attorney John Mak (Sung Kang), and politician Rashad Tate (Larenz Tate) also appear in the show's later seasons.

Episodes

Cast and characters

Notes

Main
 Omari Hardwick as James "Ghost" St. Patrick , a high-level drug distributor and nightclub owner. He is married to Tasha, is the father of Tariq, Raina, and Yasmine St. Patrick, and is also romantically involved with AUSA Angela Valdes. 
 Joseph Sikora as Thomas "Tommy" Egan, Ghost's partner,  best friend, and the godfather to his children. Egan is seen as an honorary member of his family. 
 Lela Loren as Angela Valdes, an Assistant United States Attorney tasked with prosecuting Ghost unaware of his real identity. She went to the same high school as St. Patrick and Egan. She is St. Patrick's love interest and mistress.
 Naturi Naughton as Tasha St. Patrick, Ghost's wife and criminal accomplice. She has romantic affairs with Kanan's son Shawn and attorney Terry Silver.  She is also Q's new love interest. 
 Curtis Jackson as Kanan Stark, a fellow drug dealer and Ghost's and Tommy's former mentor-turned rival. Prior to the events of the series, he was set up by Ghost and Tasha to go to prison for ten years. 
 Michael Rainey Jr. as Tariq James St. Patrick, Tasha and James's son. An honor student, he has a strained relationship with James/Ghost because of his marriage-ending relationship with Angela and lying about being involved in the drug game and being mentored by Kanan. Tariq has two sisters: a twin, Raina St. Patrick, who is later murdered by a crooked police officer, named Raymond "Ray Ray" Jones, when Tariq was involved in pulling home invasion robberies with Kanan and Ray Ray; and a younger sister, Yasmine St. Patrick.
 La La Anthony as Lakeisha Grant, Tasha's friend and criminal accomplice. She is a hairstylist and business owner. She becomes Tommy's love interest in the later seasons.
 Rotimi Akinosho as Andre "Dre" Coleman, a low-profile and ambitious drug dealer. He works with both Ghost and Kanan and eventually becomes a major player under Alicia Jiménez.
 Shane Johnson as Cooper Saxe, a fellow attorney and Angela's colleague also assigned to the Ghost case.
 Jerry Ferrara as Joseph "Joe" Proctor, a criminal attorney who frequently represents Ghost and Tommy.
 Sinqua Walls as Shawn Stark, Kanan’s son who is also the personal chauffeur and loyal bodyguard of Ghost. But he starts an affair with Tasha.
 Sung Kang as John Mak, an Assistant U.S. attorney who leads the case in the murder of FBI agent Greg Knox.
 Larenz Tate as Rashad Tate, a New York City councilman who is running for governor of New York. Tate uses James for PR for his campaign, as St. Patrick is viewed as an inspiration to potential urban voters. Tate is a former police officer and frequently participates in corruption.
 J.R. Ramirez as Julio Moreno, Ghost and Tommy's right-hand man and a former Toros Locos gang member.
 Matt Cedeno as Diego "Cristobal" Martinez, Dre's best friend and a head of the Hermanos Tainos.
 William Sadler as Anthony "Tony" Teresi, an incarcerated Italian-American gangster and caporegime in the Mosconi crime family. He is the father of Tommy Egan.
 Lucy Walters as Holly, a petty criminal and waitress at Truth and the love interest to Tommy.
 Andy Bean as Gregory "Greg" Knox, an FBI agent assigned to the Ghost/Lobos case and Angela's former love interest. 
 David Fumero as Miguel "Mike" Sandoval, a corrupt FBI Assistant U.S. Attorney.
 Cynthia Addai-Robinson as Ramona Garrity, a political strategist for the DNC.
 Michael J. Ferguson as Francis "2-Bit" Johnson. Former accomplice of Dre/Kanan who runs with Tommy now
 Mike Dopud as Jason Micic, Tommy's Serbian connect.
 Evan Handler as Jacob Warner

Recurring

 Elizabeth Rodriguez as Paz Valdes, Angela's sister who maintains a dislike for James.
 Donshea Hopkins as Raina St. Patrick, James and Tasha's eldest daughter and twin sister to Tariq. 
 Enrique Murciano as Felipe Lobos, an international drug supplier who works with Ghost and Tommy.
 Quincy Tyler Bernstine as Tameika Robinson, the leader of the United States Department of Justice.
 Victor Garber as Simon Stern, a rival nightclub owner.
 Ana de la Reguera as Alicia Jiménez, Diego's sister and one of the leaders of the Jiménez cartel.
 Patricia Kalember as Kate Egan, Tommy's mother.
 Bill Sage as Sammy, an Irish gangster who works with Tommy.
 Anika Noni Rose as Laverne "Jukebox" Ganner, a dirty cop and Kanan's cousin.
 Maurice Compte as Diego Jiménez, a rival drug supplier and one of the leaders of the Jiménez cartel.
 Avery Mason as Black "BG" Grimace, Tommy's right-hand man and valet.
 Amaya Carr as Yasmine St. Patrick, James and Tasha's daughter and sister to Tariq.
 Debbi Morgan as Estelle, Tasha's mother.
 Denim Roberson as Cash Grant, LaKeisha's son.
 Ty Jones as SAC Jerry Donovan, an FBI agent working on the Lobos and Jimenez cases.
 Mattea Conforti as Elisa Marie Proctor, Joey's daughter.
 Aleksandar Popovic as Petar, a member of the Serbian organization who worked with Tommy.
 Andrea-Rachel Parker as Destiny, Tariq's ex fling. 
 Tyrone Marshall Brown as Quinton "Q" Wallace, Tasha's new love interest.
 Joseph Perrino as Vincent Ragni, a member of the mob, Tommy and Tony conflicted with.
 Franky G as Poncho, the new primera for the Soldados Family, after Ruiz. 
 Gianni Paolo as Brayden Weston, Tariq's best friend and business partner.
 Alix Lapri as Effie, Tariq's new love interest. 
 Omar Scroggins as Spottswood "Spanky" Richards, a childhood friend of Dre's and 2Bit's, who later works under Dre and Tommy. 
 Glynn Turman as Gabriel, Ghost's uncle.
 Charlie Murphy as Marshal Clyde Williams, a violent guard in Ghost's cell block.
 Jim Norton as Father Callahan, a priest who sells drugs for Tommy.
 Lee Tergesen as Bailey Markham, a Homeland Security agent and Greg Knox's friend.
 Sonya Walger as Madeline Stern, Simon's wife.
 C. S. Lee as Jae Shin, Korean crime boss.
 Johnathan Park as Dylan, Jae Shin's son.
 Richard Ryker as Steve Tampio, a DEA agent Angela deals with.
 Ian Paola as Uriel Diaz, leader of the Toros Locos.
 Victor Almanzar as Arturo Magdaleno, Dre and Cristobal's right-hand man and a new leader of the Toros Locos.
 Darrell Britt-Gibson as Rolla, a close friend of Ghost's and leader of the RSK's.
 Danielle Thorpe as Lindsay Proctor, Joey's junkie ex-wife.
 Mercedes Ruehl as Connie Teresi, Tony's wife.
 Domenick Lombardozzi as Benny Civello, a member of the Civello crime family and Joey Proctor's cousin.
 Michael Gaston as Judge Tapper, the judge on Ghost's case.
 Sheena Sakai as Soo, Julio's girlfriend.
 Maria Rivera as Maria Suarez, a witness Ghost spared.
 Vinicius Zorin-Machado as Nomar Arcielo, a Soldado turned informant for Angela.
 Leslie Lopez as "Pink Sneakers", an assassin hired to target Ghost's operation.
 Ivica Marc as Drago, Jason's right-hand man.
 Cedric the Entertainer as Croop, a hitman Tate associates with.
 Audrey Esparza as Liliana, Julio's friend, became Tommy's right-hand woman on Power Book IV: Force.

Special guest appearances 
 Kendrick Lamar as Laces, a Dominican drug addict who works with Kanan.
 Jesse Williams as Kadeem, Lakeisha's ex, and father of their son, Cash.

Broadcast
In Australia, all episodes are available to stream after their US airing on Stan. The show is available weekly after its US airing on Netflix in the United Kingdom and Ireland. In Scandinavia and Finland, all episodes are available to stream on HBO Nordic.

Accolades

Reception

Critical response

Season 1
Season 1 of Power received mixed reviews from critics. Review aggregator Metacritic gives the season a score of 57 out of 100, based on 15 reviews, indicating a mixed reaction to the series. Review aggregator Rotten Tomatoes gives the season a score of 44%, based on 18 reviews, with an average rating of 5.7/10. The site's consensus states, "Power suffers from excessive plotting and the use of overly familiar by-the-numbers story elements."

Tim Goodman of The Hollywood Reporter observed in his review, "Power seemingly wants to be a show that tells a big, complicated, meaningful story about, well, the perils and problems of power and how one man deals with them." The New York Daily News staff writes in their review, "Power hits on all cylinders as it returns for its second season. Throw a couple of great women into Ghost's life—his wife, Tasha (Naturi Naughton), and his recently resurfaced lifelong flame Angela (Lela Loren)—and you have drama that's hard not to keep watching." Critic Brian Lowry of Variety states in his review, "The three previewed episodes of the show, created by The Good Wife alumna Courtney A. Kemp, move briskly enough, but they're still only moderately compelling. And while 50 Cent's participation provides some promotional heft (he has a cameo in a later episode), the allure of such behind-the-scenes marquee names is usually limited. Mostly, this is undemanding escapism with all the requisite pay-TV trappings, along the lines of what Cinemax is offering in episodic form. While that might be a formula to keep Ghost visible for some time to come, creatively speaking, it leaves Power a touch low on juice.

Season 2
Review aggregator Rotten Tomatoes gives the season a score of 100%, based on 9 reviews, with an average rating of 7.8/10. Review aggregator Metacritic gives the season a score of 75 out of 100, based on 4 reviews, indicating a generally favorable reaction to the series.

Season 3
Rotten Tomatoes gives the season a score of 78%, based on 9 reviews, with an average rating of 6.3/10.

Season 4
Rotten Tomatoes gives the season a score of 83%, based on 6 reviews, with an average rating of 8/10.

Season 5
Rotten Tomatoes gives the season a score of 100%, based on 6 reviews, with an average rating of 8.8/10.

Spin-offs

 
With the conclusion of the original series, it was announced that Starz had planned four upcoming spin-offs in the same universe as Power. These begin with Power Book II: Ghost, which, following shortly after the events of the original series, focuses on Ghost's son Tariq navigating his new criminal life and intending to shed his father's legacy while dealing with mounting pressure to protect his family, including his mother Tasha. The series co-stars Mary J. Blige and Method Man. The other spin-offs include: Power Book III: Raising Kanan, a prequel into the life of Kanan Stark (50 Cent); Power Book IV: Force, which follows Tommy Egan (Joseph Sikora) to Los Angeles, California and ending up in the city of Chicago; and Power Book V: Influence, a sequel set in the political world centring on Councilman Tate's (Larenz Tate) ruthless rise to power. The development of Power Book V: Influence was cancelled in August 2022 and the series would not be moving forward.

Power Book II: Ghost premiered on September 6, 2020, and has aired two seasons. In December 2021, the series was renewed for a third season which is set to premiere on March 17, 2023.

Power Book III: Raising Kanan premiered on July 18, 2021, and has aired two seasons. In August 2022, the series was renewed for a third season.

Power Book IV: Force premiered its first season on February 6, 2022. In March 2022, the series was renewed for a second season.

References

External links
 
 

2010s American black television series
2020s American black television series
2010s American crime drama television series
2014 American television series debuts
2020 American television series endings
2020s American crime drama television series
Television series by G-Unit Films and Television Inc.
English-language television shows
Gangs in fiction
Serial drama television series
Starz original programming
Television series by CBS Studios
Television shows filmed in New York (state)
Television shows set in New York City
Television series about organized crime
Works about African-American organized crime
Works about gangs
Works about Mexican drug cartels
Works about the Serbian Mafia
Television series about prosecutors